Zuivska power station (also known as Zuivska TES) is a thermal power station at Zuhres in Donetsk Oblast, Ukraine.

See also

 List of power stations in Ukraine

Coal-fired power stations in Ukraine
Chimneys in Ukraine